Events in the year 1758 in India.

Events
National income - ₹9,451 million
20 April – Marathas attacked Lahore and occupied it.
Tukoji Holkar conquered Multan, Dera Ghazi Khan, Kashmir, Attock and Peshawar by 8 May.
Madras besieged by the French.

References

 
India
Years of the 18th century in India